Rune Bjurström (22 September 1912 – 29 August 1996) was a Swedish racewalker. He competed in the men's 50 kilometres walk at the 1948 Summer Olympics.

References

1912 births
1996 deaths
Athletes (track and field) at the 1948 Summer Olympics
Swedish male racewalkers
Olympic athletes of Sweden
Place of birth missing
20th-century Swedish people